Cirrochroa tyche, the common yeoman, is a species of nymphalid butterfly found in forested areas of tropical South Asia and Southeast Asia.

The wings of the common yeoman are tawny orange with black distal margin on the upperside. There are black post-discal spots on the hindwing. Both wings have a silvery white transverse band.

Subspecies
C. t. tyche (central and southern Philippines)
C. t. anjira Moore, 1877 (Andamans)
C. t. aurica Eliot, 1978 (Pulau Aur, Pulau Tioman, Pulau Permanggil)
C. t. laudabilis Fruhstorfer, 1900 (Palawan, Dumaran)
C. t. lesseta Fruhstorfer, 1912 (southern China, Hainan and possibly Hong Kong)
C. t. mithila Moore, 1872 (Sikkim and Assam to Indochina and southern Yunnan)
C. t. rotundata Butler, 1879 (southern Burma and possibly Java and Sumatra)
C. t. thilina Fruhstorfer, 1905 (Borneo)

References

Vagrantini
Butterflies of Asia
Butterflies of Indochina
Butterflies of Borneo
Butterflies described in 1861
Taxa named by Baron Cajetan von Felder
Taxa named by Rudolf Felder